A middle school (also known as intermediate school, junior high school, junior secondary school, or lower secondary school) is an educational stage which exists in some countries, providing education between primary school and secondary school. The concept, regulation and classification of middle schools, as well as the ages covered, vary between and sometimes within countries.

Afghanistan
In Afghanistan, middle school includes grades 6, 7, and 8, consisting of students from ages 11 to 14.

Algeria
In Algeria, a middle school includes 4 grades: 6, 7, 8, and 9, consisting of students from ages 11–15.

Argentina

The  of secondary education (ages 11–14) is roughly equivalent to middle school.

Australia
No regions of Australia have segregated middle schools, as students go directly from primary school (for years K/preparatory–6) to secondary school (years 7–12, usually referred to as high school).

As an alternative to the middle school model, some secondary schools classify their grades as "middle school" (years 5,6,7,8 where primary and secondary campuses share facilities or 7,8,9 in a secondary campus) or "junior high school" (years 7, 8, 9, and 10) and "senior high school" (years 11 and 12). Some have three levels, "junior" (years 7 and 8), "intermediate" (years 9 and 10), and "senior" (years 11 and 12). Some schools run a specialised year 9 program segregated from the other secondary year levels.

In 1996 and 1997, a national conference met to develop what became known as the National Middle Schooling Project, which aimed to develop a common Australian view of
 early adolescent needs
 guiding principles for educators
 appropriate strategies to foster positive adolescent learning.
Other schools have since followed this trend.

The Northern Territory has introduced a three tier system featuring Middle Schools for years 7–9 (approximate age 13–15) and high school year 10–12 (approximate age 16–18).

Many schools across Queensland have introduced a Middle School tier within their schools. The middle schools cover years 5 to 8.

Bangladesh 
In Bangladesh, middle school is not separated as in other countries. Generally, schools are from class 1 to class 10. It means lower primary (1–5), upper primary (6–10). Class 6–8 is thought of as middle school. Grades 1,2,3,4 and 5 are said to be primary school while all the classes from 6 to 10 are considered high school (as middle school and high school are not considered separate) while 11–12 (inclusive) is called college.
 1–5 is known as primary (Part of Primary School)
 6–8 is known as lower secondary (Part of High School)
 9–10 is known as secondary (part of High School)
 11–12 is known as higher secondary also known as college.

Bolivia 
Middle schools in Bolivia have been abolished since 1994. Students aged 11–15 attend the last years of elementary education or the first years of secondary education.

Bosnia and Herzegovina 
In Bosnia and Herzegovina "high school" refers to educational institutions for ages between 14 and 18, and lasts 3–4 years, following elementary school (which lasts 8 or 9 years). "Gymnasiums" are the most prestigious type of high school.

Brazil 
In Brazil, middle school is a mandatory stage that precedes High School called "Ensino Fundamental II" consisting of grades 6 to 9,ages 11 to 14.

Canada

In Canada, the terms "Middle School" and "Junior High School" are both used, depending on which grades the school caters to. Junior high schools tend to include only grades 7, 8, and sometimes 9 (some older schools with the name 'carved in concrete' still use "Junior High" as part of their name, although grade nine is now missing), whereas middle schools are usually grades 6–8 or only grades 7–8 or 6–7 (i.e. around ages 11–14), varying from area to area and also according to population vs. building capacity.

Another common model is grades 5–8. Alberta, Nova Scotia, Newfoundland, and Prince Edward Island junior high schools typically include grades 7–9, with the first year of high school traditionally being grade 10. In some places students go from elementary school to secondary school, meaning the elementary school covers to the end of grade 8.

In Ontario, the term "Middle School" and "Senior Public School" (sometimes just grades 7 and 8) are used, with the latter being used particularly in the Old Toronto and Scarborough sections of Toronto plus in Mississauga, Brampton, and Kitchener-Waterloo. In many smaller Ontario cities and in some parts of larger cities,  most elementary schools serve junior kindergarten to grade 8 meaning there are no separate Middle Schools buildings, while in some cities (such as Hamilton) specific schools do serve the intermediate grades (i.e. Grades 6–8 or Grades 7–8) but are still called "Elementary" or "Public" schools with no recognition of the grades they serve in their name.

Quebec uses a grade system that is different from those of the other provinces. In Quebec, there is no Middle school section. The Secondary level has five grades starting after Elementary Grade 6. These are called Secondary I to Secondary V.

Chile

Chile does not have middle schools, they instead have "Educación Básica" that teaches the same as elementary and middle school.For them, "Educación Básica" is from 1st grade to 8th grade. Now the government is working on some changes that will be official on 2027, considering 7th and 8th grade part from "Educación Media", or High School.

China

In the People's Republic of China, primary school covers grades 1–6 and secondary school covers grades 7–12. The Chinese junior high school is roughly equivalent to an American middle school, and provides the last 3 years of the nine-year compulsory education required for all Chinese citizens. The senior high school is optional but considered as critical preparation for tertiary education.

The admissions for most students to enrol in senior secondary schools from the junior stage are on the basis of the scores that they get in "Senior High School Entrance Exam", which are held by local governments.  Other students may bypass the exam, based on their distinctive talents, like athletics, leadership merits or excellent coursework performance in junior stage.

Colombia

Secondary education is divided into basic secondary (grades 6 to 9) and mid-secondary (grades 10 and 11). The students in basic secondary, roughly equivalent to middle school, are 11 or 12 to 15 or 16 years old.

Croatia 
In Croatia "middle school" refers to educational institutions for ages between 11 and 14, from 5th to 8th grade and is a part of elementary school. Following elementary school (which lasts 8 years), students enroll into High School, which can last from 3 to 5 years, depending on the chosen type. "Gymnasiums" are the most prestigious type of high school. Students graduating from "Gymnasiums" typically have to continue their education to college, which, in Croatia, is divided to 3 years for the bachelors degree, plus 2 additional to get the masters degree.

Cuba 

 (basic secondary, seventh through ninth grades) is the approximate equivalent of middle school in Cuba.

Czech Republic 
In the Czech Republic after completing the nine-year elementary school (compulsory school attendance) a student may apply for high school or grammar school.

Students have the opportunity to enroll in high school from Grade 6 or (less commonly) Grade 8 of elementary school, spending eight or six years respectively at high school that otherwise takes four years. Thus they can spend five years in elementary school, followed by eight in high school. The first four years of the eight-year study program at high school are comparable with junior high school. Gymnasium focuses on a more advanced academic approach to education. All other types of high schools except gymnasiums and conservatories (e.g. lyceums) accept only students that finished Grade 9.

Ecuador 

Egypt
In Egypt, middle school precedes high school. It is called the preparatory stage and consists of three phases: first preparatory in which students study more subjects than primary with different branches. For instance, algebra and geometry are taught instead of "mathematics." In the second preparatory phase, students study science, geography, the history of Egypt starting with pharaonic history, including Coptic history, Islamic history, and concluding with modern history. The students are taught two languages, Arabic and English. Middle school (preparatory stage) lasts for three years.

France
Upon completion of the latter, students are awarded a  if they obtain a certain number of points on a series of tests in various subjects (French, history/geography, mathematics, physics/chemistry), but also on a series of skills completed during the last year and on oral examinations (e.g. about cross-subjects themes they work on the latest years, the fourth year of collège).

Georgia

In Georgia, the equivalent period to middle school covers ages 12 to 15, from the 7th grade to the 9th and guarantees basic educational degree certificate.

Gibraltar
There are four middle schools in Gibraltar, following the English model of middle-deemed-primary schools accommodating pupils aged between 9 and 12 (National Curriculum Years 4 to 7). The schools were opened in 1972 when the government introduced comprehensive education in the territory.

Greece

In Greece, the equivalent period to middle school is called , which caters to children between the ages 12 and 15, i.e. 7th, 8th, and 9th grade.

India

In India, Middle School is classified as Upper Primary (Class 6–8). Each state has its own State Board. Each has its own standards, which might be different from the Central Boards. In some institutions, providing education for 5th to 10th is known as a secondary school.

The levels of education in India are:
 Pre-Primary – Nursery to KG
 Primary (Lower Primary) – Classes I to V
 Middle School (Upper Primary) – Classes VI to VIII
 High school – Classes IX to X
 Higher Secondary (PUC or Plus Two) – Classes XI to XII

Indonesia

In Indonesia, middle school covers ages 12 to 15 or grade 7 to grade 9.

Although compulsory education ends at junior high, most pursue higher education. There are around 22,000 middle schools in Indonesia with a balanced ownership between public and private sector.

Iran
Iran calls Middle School Guidance School, which caters to children between the ages 12 and 15, i.e. 7th, 8th and 9th grade.

Israel
In most of the cities in Israel, middle school covers ages 12 to 15. From the 7th grade to the 9th.

Italy
In Italy the equivalent is the  formerly and commonly called lower middle school, often shortened to middle school. The Middle School lasts three years from the student age of 11 to age 14. Since 2009, after Gelmini reform, the middle school was renamed  (junior secondary school).

Jamaica 
Middle school in Jamaica is called  "Junior High School." It is from grade 7–9 but this idea is becoming rare now so these grades are considered lower secondary.

(They also have a primary school (grades 1–6)

Japan

Junior high schools 7th to 9th grade are for children aged twelve through fifteen years old.

Kosovo
In Kosovo "middle school" refers to educational institutions for ages between 14 and 18, and lasts 3–4 years, following elementary school (which lasts 8 or 9 years). "Gymnasiums" are the most prestigious type of "middle" school.

Kuwait 
In Kuwait, middle school is from grade 6–9 and from age 11–14.

Lebanon
In Lebanon, middle school or intermediate school consists of grades 7, 8, and 9. At the end of 9th grade, the student is given the National diploma examination.

North Macedonia
In North Macedonia middle school refers to educational institutions for ages between 14 and 18, and lasts 3–4 years, following elementary school (which lasts 8 or 9 years). "Gymnasiums" are the most prestigious type of middle school.

Malaysia 
In Malaysia, the middle school equivalent is called lower secondary school which consists of students from age 13 to 15 (Form 1–3). Usually, these lower secondary schools are combined with upper secondary schools to form a single secondary school which is also known as high school. Students at the end of their lower secondary studies are required to sit for an examination called PT3 (Form 3. 7 subjects for non-Muslim students and 8 subjects for Muslim students) in order to determine their field of studies for upper secondary (Form 4–5).

Mexico

In Mexico, the middle school system is called  and usually comprises three years, grades 7–9 (ages: 7 12–13, 8 13–14, 9: 14–15). It is completed after  (Elementary School, up to grade 6: ages 6–12) and before  (High School, grades 10–12 ages 15–18).

Montenegro 
In Montenegro middle school refers to educational institutions for ages between 14 and 18, and lasts 3–4 years, following elementary school (which lasts 8 or 9 years). "Gymnasiums" are the most prestigious type of "middle" school.

New Zealand 

In New Zealand middle schools are known as "intermediate schools." They generally cover years 7 and 8 (formerly known as Forms 1 to 2). Students are generally aged between 10 and 13. There are full primary schools which also contain year 7 and 8 with students continuing to secondary school at year 9 (formerly known as Form 3). Some secondary schools also include years 7 and 8.

After 2000 there was an increased interest in middle schooling (for years 7–10) with at least seven schools offering education to this age group opening around the country in Auckland, Cambridge, Hamilton, Christchurch and Upper Hutt.

Pakistan

In Pakistan, middle school is called Secondary School and is from Grade 6- 10. This covers both the traditional middle and high school. Although for private schools it may be different

Peru

There aren't middle schools in Peru.

Philippines

Since the implementation of the K–12 education system, middle school education in the Philippines is called "Junior High School." It lasts for 4 years from Grades 7 to 10 for students age 12 to 16. Some schools, such as Miriam College in Loyola Heights as well as Lourdes School of Quezon City in Sta. Mesa Heights, have their Middle Schools from Grades 6 to 8. It is preceded by a 6-year elementary school and followed by a 2-year "senior high school" program.

Before that, there were no official middle school programs implemented and the equivalent years was simply called "High School" which ranged from 1st Year to 4th Year.

Poland

Following a 2017 education reform the Polish middle school called  was disbanded.  After eight years of mandatory primary school, pupils can move on to a high school of choice, each spanning a year more than before.

Middle school in Poland was first introduced in 1932. The education was intended for pupils of at least 12 years of age and lasted four years. They were abolished by the Polish People's Republic government in a 1948 reform. The middle schools were then reinstated in 1999, lasting three years after six years of primary school. Pupils entering  were usually 13 years old. Middle school was compulsory for all students, and was the final stage of mandatory education. In the final year students would take a standardized test to evaluate their academic skills. Based on the test results, they were then admitted to a high school of their choice.

Portugal

In Portugal, the middle school is known as 2nd and 3rd cycles of basic education. It comprises the 5th till 9th year of compulsory education, for children between ten and fifteen years old. After the education reform of 1986, the former preparatory school:
 1st cycle – former primary education
 "1st year" (6–7 years old)
 "2nd year" (7–8 years old)
 "3rd year" (8–9 years old)
 "4th year" (9–10 years old)
 2nd cycle – former preparatory education
 "5th year" (10–11 years old)
 "6th year" (11–12 years old)
 3rd cycle
 "7th year" (12–13 years old)
 "8th year" (13–14 years old)
 "9th year" (14–15 years old)
 High School
 "10th year" (15–16 years old)
 "11th year" (16–17 years old)
 "12th year" (17–18 years old)

Romania

Middle school in Romania, or gymnasium, includes grades 5 to 8 and the students usually share the building with the students of primary school but in different wings/floors. Primary school lessons are taught by a handful of teachers: most are covered by one of them, and more specific areas such as foreign languages, religion or gym may have dedicated teachers. The transition to middle school changes of that to a one teacher per course model where the students usually remain in the same classroom while the teachers rotate between courses. At the end of the eighth grade (usually corresponding to age 14 or 15), students take a written exam that counts for 80% (before, it used to be 50%) of the average needed to enroll in high school. Students then go to high school or vocational school, depending on their final grade. Since 2020, all four years of upper secondary education, up to the twelfth grade, are compulsory. The education process is done in numbered semesters, the first semester lasting 15 weeks between September and December and the second semester lasting 20 weeks between January and June. Since 2022, the school year is divided into 5 modules.

Russia

Middle school in Russia covers grades 5 to 9, and is a natural continuation of primary school activities (almost always they are in the same building with both primary and high school, usually located in different wings/floors). Primary school lessons are taught by a handful of teachers: most are covered by one of them, and more specific areas such as English or gym may have dedicated teachers. The transition to middle school changes that to a one teacher per course model, where teachers stay in their classrooms and pupils change rooms during breaks. Examples of courses include mathematics (split from grade 7 into algebra, geometry and physics), visual arts, Russian language, foreign language, history, literature, geography, biology, computer science, chemistry (from grade 8), social theory (in grade 9). The education process is done in numbered quarters, with the first quarter covering September and October, second quarter November and December, third quarter going from mid January to mid March, fourth quarter covering April and May. There are one week long holidays between quarters 1 and 2 as well as 3 and 4, somewhat longer holidays between quarters 2 and 3 to allow for New Year festivities, and a three-month break between the years. At the end of middle school most people stay in school for two more years and get a certificate allowing them to pursue university, but some switch to vocational-technical schools.

Saudi Arabia

In Saudi Arabia, middle school includes grade 7 through 9, consisting of students from ages 12 to 15.

Serbia 
In Serbia middle school refers to the second half of primary (elementary) education for ages between 11 and 15 (10 to 14 if the person is born before March) and lasts 4 years (grades 5 through 8), following the first half of primary school (grades 1 through 4, ages 7 to 11). Middle schools are not considered separate from elementary school in Serbia but rather an extension of it and are usually held in the same school building, but in opposite shifts or in a different part of the school building. Middle school is the transitional period from primary education to secondary education (high school) where children are transitioned from having very generalized subjects and a main teacher for most of them with only a handful of other teachers for specialized subjects like English, music and gym to a more serious curriculum with a course load that better mirrors high school. Middle school is the first time children have separate teachers for each subject and are introduced to courses like history, geography, biology and a second foreign language (most commonly Russian, German, French) and later physics and chemistry. Both elementary and middle school are compulsory in Serbia, after which almost all students take the state-issued universal entrance exam to qualify for high school, be it a Gymnasium, a specialized high school for fields like Economics or Medicine, or a Vocational school (trade school).

Singapore 

In Singapore, middle school is usually referred to as secondary school. Students start secondary school after completing primary school at the age of 13, and to 16 (four years if they are taking the Special, Express or Normal Technical courses), or 17 (five years if they are taking the Normal Academic courses). Students from the Special and Express courses take the GCE 'O' Levels after four years at the end of secondary education, and students from the Normal (Academic and Technical) courses take the GCE 'N' Level examinations after four years, and the Normal Academic students has the option to continue for the O Levels. Selected excelling students also have the option to change classes which then affect the years they study. After completing secondary school, students move on to pre-tertiary education (i.e. in institutes such as junior colleges, polytechnics, ITE).

Slovenia 
In Slovenia "middle school" refers to educational institutions for ages between 14 and 18, and lasts 3–4 years, following elementary school (which lasts 8 or 9 years). "Gymnasiums" are the most prestigious type of "middle" school.

Somalia 

In Somalia, middle school identified as intermediate school is the four years between secondary school and primary school. Pupils start middle school from form as referred to in Somalia or year 5 and finish it at year 8. Students start middle school from the age of 11 and finish it when they are 14–15. Subjects, which middle school pupils take are: Somali, Arabic, English, Religion, Science, Geography, History, Math, Textiles, Art and Design, Physical Education (PE) (Football) and sometimes Music. In some middle schools, it is obligatory to study Italian.

South Korea

Spain

In Spain, education is compulsory for children and teenagers between 6 and 16 years. The usual ages in ESO are 12 to 15 years old, but they can range between 11 and 16 depending on the birth date (a student who was born late in the year may start ESO at 11 if he or she will turn 12 before January 1, and a student who was born early in the year may finish ESO after turning 16).

Taiwan
Junior high schools (three years from 7th to 9th grade) in Taiwan were originally called primary middle school. However, in August 1968, they were renamed nationals' middle school  often translated junior high)  when they became free of charge and compulsory. Private middle school nowadays are still called primary middle school. Taiwanese students older than twelve normally attend junior high school. Accompanied with the switch from junior high to middle school was the cancellation of entrance examination needed to enter middle school.

Tunisia and Morocco

In Tunisia and Morocco, a middle school includes grades 7 through 9, consisting of students from ages 12 to 15.

United Kingdom

England and Wales

In England and Wales, local education authorities introduced middle schools in the 1960s and 1970s. The notion of middle schools was mooted by the Plowden Report of 1967 which proposed a change to a three-tier model including first schools for children aged between 5 and 8, middle schools for 8–12 year-olds, and then high schools for 12–16 year-olds. Some authorities introduced middle schools for ideological reasons, in line with the report, while others did so for more pragmatic reasons relating to the raising of the school leaving age in compulsory education to 16, or to introduce a comprehensive system.

Different authorities introduced different age-range schools, although in the main, three models were used:
 5–8 first schools, followed by 8–12 middle schools, as suggested by Plowden
 5–9 first schools, followed by 9–13 middle schools
 5–10 first schools followed by 10–13 middle schools or intermediate schools

In many areas "primary school" rather than first school was used to denote the first tier.

In addition, some schools were provided as combined schools catering for pupils in the 5–12 age range as a combined first and middle school.

Around 2000 middle and combined schools were in place in the early 1980s. However, that number began to fall in the later 1980s with the introduction of the National Curriculum. The new curriculum's splits in Key Stages at age 11 encouraged the majority of local education authorities to return to a two-tier system of Primary (sometimes split into Infant schools and Junior schools) and Secondary schools. There are now fewer than 150 middle schools still operational in the United Kingdom, meaning that approximately 90% of middle schools have closed or reverted to primary school status since 1980. The system of 8–12 middle schools has fallen into complete disuse.

Under current legislation, as also at the time of the Plowden report, all schools must be deemed either primary or secondary. Thus, middle schools which have more primary year groups than KS3 or KS4 are termed "deemed primaries" or "middles-deemed-primaries," while those with more secondary-aged pupils, or with pupils in Y11 are termed "deemed secondaries" or "middles-deemed-secondaries." For statistical purposes, such schools are often included under primary and secondary categories "as deemed". Notably, most schools also follow teaching patterns in line with their deemed status, with most deemed-primary schools offering a primary-style curriculum taught by one class teacher, and most deemed-secondary schools adopting a more specialist-centred approach. Legally all-through schools are also considered middle schools (deemed secondary), although they are rarely referred to as such.

Some middle schools still exist in various areas of England. They are supported by the National Middle Schools' Forum. See List of middle schools in England.

Scotland
In Scotland, a similar system to the English one was trialled in Grangemouth middle schools, Falkirk between 1975 and 1987. The label of "junior high school" is used for some through schools in Orkney and Shetland which cater for pupils from 5 up to the age of 14, at which point they transfer to a nearby secondary school.

Northern Ireland
In Northern Ireland, in the Armagh, Banbridge and Craigavon District Council area in County Armagh, the Dickson Plan operates, whereby pupils attend a primary school from ages 4–10, a junior high school from 11–14, and a senior high school or grammar school from 14–19.

United States

In the United States, elementary school often includes kindergarten to fourth, fifth, or sixth grade; less commonly, some elementary schools extend as far as 8th grade. Middle schools and junior high schools are schools that span varying combinations of grades 5 to 8 (sometimes 9), such as 5-6, 5-7, 5–8, 6-7, 6–8 (most commonly), 7-8, and sometimes 7–9. Historically, local public control (and private alternatives) over education has allowed for some variation in the organization of schools. Basic subjects are taught and pupils often remain in one or two classrooms throughout the school day, except for physical education, library, music, art, and computer classes. In 2003, there were about 3.6 million children in each grade in the United States. In some parts of the US, students cycle through classrooms throughout the day for different core subjects even at the middle and junior-high grades.

The range defined by either is often based on demographic factors, such as an increase or decrease in the relative numbers of younger or older students, with the aim of maintaining stable school populations. At this time, pupils are given more independence, moving to different classrooms for different subjects, which includes math, social studies, science, English language arts, and also sometimes the choice to start learning a new language. Also, pupils are able to choose some of their class subjects (electives). Usually, starting in sixth grade, grades become part of a pupil's official transcript.

The junior high school concept was introduced in 1909, in Columbus, Ohio. Junior high schools were created for "bridging the gap between the elementary and the high school", an emphasis credited to Charles W. Eliot. In the late 19th century and early 20th century, most American elementary schools had grades 1 through 8, and this organization still exists, where some concepts of middle school organization have been adapted to the intermediate grades. As time passed, the junior high school concept increased quickly as new school districts proliferated, or systems modernized buildings and curricula. This expansion continued through the 1960s. Jon Wiles, author of Developing Successful K–8 Schools: A Principal's Guide, said that "a major problem" for the original model was "the inclusion of the ninth grade", because of the lack of instructional flexibility, due to the requirement of having to earn high school credits in the ninth grade and that "the fully adolescent ninth grader in junior high school did not seem to belong with the students experiencing the onset of puberty".

The new middle school model began to appear in the mid-1960s. Wiles said, "At first, it was difficult to determine the difference between a junior high school and a middle school, but as the middle school became established, the differences became more pronounced". Middle school is in between elementary school and high school, and typically has 6th- to 8th-graders. Junior high schools prepare seventh, eighth, and, in some districts, ninth grade students for high school.

The faculty is organised into academic departments that operate more or less independently of one another.

The middle school format has now replaced the junior high format by a ratio of about ten to one in the United States, but some school districts have incorporated both systems or a mix of the two.

Uruguay

In Uruguay public secondary school consists of two stages, one mandatory called "Basic Cycle" or "First Cycle" (ciclo básico). This consists of three years, ages 12–13, 13–14 and 14–15 (equivalent to American 7th, 8th, and 9th grades), and one optional called "Second Cycle" (bachillerato), ages 15–16, 16–17 and 17–18 (equivalent to American 10th, 11th, and 12th grades). The Second Cycle is divided into 4 options in the Uruguayan 5th grade: "Human Sciences", "Biology", "Scientific" and "Arts", and 7 options in the 6th and last grade: "Law" or "Economy" (if Human Sciences course taken in 5th), "Medicine" or "Agronomy" (if Biological course taken in 5th), "Architecture" or "Engineering" (if Scientific course taken in 5th) and "Arts" (if Arts course taken in 5th).

Both these stages are commonly known as "Liceo" (Spanish for "high school").

Venezuela

In Venezuela, middle schools (ages 12–15) are from 7th grade to 9th grade.

In some institutions called "Technical Schools" there is an extra grade, for those who want to graduate as "Middle technician" in a certain area. This education would allow them to be hired at a higher level, or get introduced more easily into a college career.

Vietnam

Secondary school, or Junior High school, includes grade 6 to 9. After finishing grade 9, students have to take the national graduating test, which includes sections on Mathematics, Literature and English. The maximum score for each test is 10, with the first two subjects (called the Core Subjects) multiplied by two for a total possible score of 50. Reward points from a vocational course could also be added to the final score.

Some public schools use graduating exam scores and student transcripts to make their decisions. Many other public and private schools require students who apply for those schools to take their  entrance exams. The administration team student transcripts and exam scores to decide whether students are qualified based on their admissions criteria.

See also 

 QuickSmart

Notes

References

External links

 Canada: Provincial Systems of Education
 Association for Middle Level Education formerly National Middle School Association.
 National Middle Schools' Forum (UK)
 Australian Middle School Program

 
Adolescence
Educational stages
 
High schools and secondary schools
Pedagogy
School terminology
School types